Landbouwbelang (LBB) is a squatted industrial building in Maastricht, Netherlands. It offers working space for artists and social entrepreneurs and functions as a venue for cultural events. It has been squatted since April 2002.

Landbouwbelang is located in the Boschstraatkwartier neighbourhood, on the bank of river Meuse and next to the production site of a paper manufacturer Sappi.

History 
The building was constructed in 1939 for processing and storing cereals by Vereniging Landbouwbelang Roermond. The cereal processing activities ceased in the 1970s and the building was acquired by the neighbouring paper mill until it was purchased by the City of Maastricht.

The space served as a venue for community events before being squatted on 6 April 2002. Landbouwbelang reported 10 000 annual visitors in 2015. Several artists, designers and social entrepreneurs have working spaces at Landbouwbelang.

Despite the Dutch squatting ban of 2009, getting the squatters removed requires an eviction court order. In order to have that granted, the owner of the building needs to present a development plan for the squatted building. According to the communication of the City of Maastricht there are currently none.

See also
 ADM
 ACU
 De Blauwe Aanslag
 Grote Broek
 OCCII
 OT301
 Vrankrijk
 Moira (Utrecht)
 Ubica

References

Further reading

External links

Squats in the Netherlands
Music venues in the Netherlands
Buildings and structures in Maastricht
Industrial buildings in the Netherlands
Social centres in the Netherlands
Infoshops